The Government of South Australia, also referred to as the South Australian Government, SA Government or more formally, His Majesty’s Government, is the Australian state democratic administrative authority of South Australia. It is modelled on the Westminster system of government, which is governed by an elected parliament.

History 

Until 1857, the Province of South Australia was ruled by a Governor responsible to the British Crown. The Government of South Australia was formed in 1857, as prescribed in its Constitution created by the  Constitution Act 1856 (an act of parliament of the then United Kingdom of Great Britain and Ireland under Queen Victoria), which created South Australia as a  self-governing colony rather than being a province governed from Britain.

Since the federation of Australia in 1901, South Australia has been a state of the Commonwealth of Australia, which is a constitutional monarchy, and the Constitution of Australia regulates the state of South Australia's relationship with the Commonwealth. Under the Australian Constitution, South Australia ceded legislative and judicial supremacy to the Commonwealth, but retained powers in all matters not in conflict with the Commonwealth.

In 1934, the 1856 Act was repealed, along with a few other acts which had amended it, and replaced by the Constitution Act 1934, which is still in force, with amendments.

Legislative powers
Legislative power rests with the Parliament of South Australia, which consists of the House of Assembly and the Legislative Council, with general elections held every four years. At these fixed four-yearly elections the whole Assembly is up for re-election, as is half of the Council is; the only exception is after a double dissolution held in accordance with Section 41 of the state Constitution, after which the whole Assembly and Council are up for re-election. Unlike the federal double dissolution procedure, the SA double dissolution procedure can only be used if the same bill, or much the same bill, has been twice rejected by the Council, after being introduced by the Assembly, with the two rejections separated by a general election.

Executive and judicial powers
South Australia is governed according to the principles of the Westminster system, a form of parliamentary government based on the model of the United Kingdom.

Executive power rests formally with the Executive Council, which consists of the governor and senior ministers. In practice, executive power is exercised by the premier of South Australia and the Cabinet of South Australia, who advise the Governor. The Cabinet comprises 15 ministers, headed by the Premier, who are either members of the House of Assembly or the Legislative Council. Cabinet is responsible for determining policies which are submitted to Parliament.

Judicial power is exercised by the Supreme Court of South Australia and a system of subordinate courts, but the High Court of Australia and other federal courts have overriding jurisdiction on matters which fall under the ambit of the Australian Constitution.

Current ministry

As of 24 March 2022, the ministry of the South Australian Government comprised the following 14 Labor Party members and 1 Independent member:

Government agencies

The South Australian Government delivers services, determines policy and regulations, including legal interpretation, by a number of agencies grouped under areas of portfolio responsibility. Each portfolio is led by a government minister who is a member of the Parliament.  there were 28 government departments and agencies listed on sa.gov.au, being:
Attorney-General's Department (includes Forensic Science SA)
Auditor-General's Department
Department for Child Protection (formerly Families SA, Family and Youth Services, Family and Community Services)
Department for Correctional Services
Country Fire Service (CFS)
Courts Administration Authority (CAA)
Defence SA
Department for Education
Electoral Commission of South Australia
Department for Environment and Water
Environment Protection Authority (EPA) - "independent statutory authority within the Environment and Water Portfolio"
Department for Energy and Mining
Green Industries SA
Department for Health and Wellbeing
SA Housing Authority
Department of Human Services
Department for Innovation and Skills
South Australian Metropolitan Fire Service (MFS)
Department for Infrastructure and Transport
Department of the Premier and Cabinet
Primary Industries and Regions SA (PIRSA), formerly Department of PIRSA
Department for Trade and Investment
Department of Treasury and Finance
SAFECOM
South Australia Police
State Emergency Service
TAFE SA
South Australian Tourism Commission

A range of other agencies support the functions of these departments.

The Legal Services Commission is a statutory authority, independent of government, "funded by both the South Australian and the Commonwealth Governments to provide legal assistance to South Australians".

Brands
  SA Health is "the brand name for the health portfolio of services and agencies responsible to our Minister, the Minister for Health and Wellbeing", including:
Department for Health and Wellbeing
SA Ambulance Service
Commission on Excellence and Innovation in Health
Wellbeing SA
Various regional health networks

Government business enterprises
South Australian Forestry Corporation trading as ForestrySA
South Australian Water Corporation trading as SA Water

See also 

 First Nations Voice to Parliament (South Australia)
 List of South Australian government agencies
List of South Australian Ministries

References

External links

The Constitution of South Australia